Hongsibu District ( (official), Hóngsìpǔ Qū (local)) is a district within the prefecture-level city of Wuzhong in the autonomous region of Ningxia, China.

Geography
The terrain is higher in the south than the north and the elevation generally ranges between 1240 and 1450 m above sea level.

History
Hongsibu first appears as a place name during the Ming dynasty.

Beginning in 1998, the area now comprising the district was chosen as a resettlement location for over 200,000 people from drought-stricken areas of southern Ningxia. In the most ambitious scheme of its kind in China, water was diverted from the Yellow River to create and irrigate  of new agricultural land.  The administrative district was established in 2009.

Administration
Hongsibu District is divided into the subdistrict of Xinmin; the towns of Hongsibu and Taiyangshan; and the townships of Xinzhuangji, Dahe and Liuquan, the last of which was created in 2014 from the western part of Xinzhuangji. The District Party Committee Secretary is Ding Jiancheng and the District Governor is Wang Zhongqiang.

Demographics
At the end of 2020 the population of Hongsibu District was 197,604, of which 40.1% lived in urban areas. The district recorded a population of 165,016 in the 2010 national census It was 51,875 in the 2000 census. 61% of the population is Hui.

Economy
Hongsibu District's gross domestic product was estimated at 1.56 billion in 2015.

Infrastructure
The Dingbian–Wuwei, Fuzhou–Yinchuan, and Gunquan-Hongsibu (formerly S19, now signed as G6) expressways run through the northern part of the district, as does the Taiyuan–Zhongwei–Yinchuan Railway. The Hongsibu Solar Park is located in the district.

References

County-level divisions of Ningxia
Wuzhong, Ningxia